Washington Report is a public affairs TV series on the now-defunct DuMont Television Network.

Broadcast history
Washington Report was a 15-minute program which aired twice weekly on DuMont from May 22, 1951, to August 31, 1951. Newsman Tristram Coffin interviewed political, business, and civic leaders. This program should not be confused with Washington Exclusive, a DuMont show which aired in 1953.

See also
List of programs broadcast by the DuMont Television Network
List of surviving DuMont Television Network broadcasts

References

Bibliography
David Weinstein, The Forgotten Network: DuMont and the Birth of American Television (Philadelphia: Temple University Press, 2004) 
Alex McNeil, Total Television, Fourth edition (New York: Penguin Books, 1980) 
Tim Brooks and Earle Marsh, The Complete Directory to Prime Time Network TV Shows, Third edition (New York: Ballantine Books, 1964)

External links
Washington Report at IMDB
DuMont historical website

1951 American television series debuts
1951 American television series endings
Black-and-white American television shows
DuMont news programming